Holubov is a municipality and village in Český Krumlov District in the South Bohemian Region of the Czech Republic. It has about 1,100 inhabitants.

Administrative parts

Villages of Krasetín and Třísov are administrative parts of Holubov.

Geography
Holubov is located in the Bohemian Forest Foothills. The whole municipality lies in the Blanský les Protected Landscape Area. The eastern border of the municipal territory is formed by the Vltava river. In the centre of Holubov there is Holubovský pond, used for leisure activities.

History
The Celts lived in the area from about 200–400 BC, and in about 60 BC they founded an oppidum in Třísov. they left the place in around 60 BC being pushed out from here by migrating Marcomanni tribe. Between 
4th and 7th century, the Slavic tribes settled here.

The first written mentions of Holubov and Třísov are from 1379, the first mention of Krasetín is from 1372. The area was owned by Vítkovci and then by the Rosenberg family as a part of the Dívčí kámen Castle estate. In 1383, a manor house called Holubův is documented here, and it probably gave the name to the village.

In the 19th century started industrialization of Holubov. From 1841 to 1874, an iron-producing factory was here. In 1891, the railway to České Budějovice and Volary was built.

Economy
Industry in Holubov is represented by the Artypa factory, which makes paper products (boxes). The municipality is otherwise dependent on agriculture and tourism.

Sights

Fragments of the Třísov oppidum have been partly preserved until today.

It is a technical monument. The original construction from 1891 was replaced in 2015.

There is a chair lift which goes from Krasetín to the top of the Kleť mountain, outside the municipal territory.

See also
4277 Holubov and 4287 Třísov, minor planets named after these villages

References

External links

Villages in Český Krumlov District